The Marshallese language ( or  ), also known as Ebon, is a Micronesian language spoken in the Marshall Islands. Spoken by the ethnic Marshallese people, the language is spoken by nearly the country's entire population of 59,000, making it the principal language of the country. There are also roughly 27,000 Marshallese citizens residing in the United States, nearly all of whom speak Marshallese, as well as in other countries including Nauru.

There are two major dialects: Rālik (western) and Ratak (eastern).

Classification 
Marshallese, a Micronesian language, is a member of the Eastern Oceanic subgroup of the Austronesian languages. The closest linguistic relatives of Marshallese are the other Micronesian languages, including Chuukese, Gilbertese, Kosraean, Nauruan and Pohnpeian. Marshallese shows 33% lexical similarity with Pohnpeian.

Within the Micronesian archipelago, Marshallese—along with the rest of the Micronesian language group—is not as closely related to the more ambiguously classified Oceanic language Yapese in Yap State, or to the Polynesian outlier languages Kapingamarangi and Nukuoro in Pohnpei State, and even less closely related to the non-Oceanic languages Palauan in Palau and Chamorro in the Mariana Islands.

Variation 
The Republic of the Marshall Islands contains 34 atolls that are split into two chains, the eastern Ratak Chain and the western Rālik Chain. These two chains have different dialects, which differ mainly lexically, and are mutually intelligible. The atoll of Ujelang in the west was reported to have "slightly less homogeneous speech", but it has been uninhabited since 1980.

The Ratak and Rālik dialects differ phonetically in how they deal with stems that begin with double consonants. Ratak Marshallese inserts a vowel to separate the consonants, while Ralik adds a vowel before the consonants (and pronounced an unwritten consonant phoneme  before the vowel).

Status 

Marshallese is the official language of the Marshall Islands and enjoys vigorous use. As of 1979, the language was spoken by 43,900 people in the Marshall Islands. in 2020 the number was closer to 59,000. Additional groups of speakers in other countries including Nauru and the United States increase the total number of Marshallese speakers, with approximately 27,000 Marshallese-Americans living in the United States Along with Pohnpeian and Chuukese, Marshallese stands out among Micronesian languages in having tens of thousands of speakers; most Micronesian languages have far fewer. A dictionary and at least two Bible translations have been published in Marshallese.

Phonology

Consonants
Marshallese has a large consonant inventory, and each consonant has some type of secondary articulation (palatalization, velarization, or rounding). The palatalized consonants are regarded as "light", and the velarized and rounded consonants are regarded as "heavy", with the rounded consonants being both velarized and labialized. (This contrast is similar to that between "slender" and "broad" consonants in Goidelic languages, or between "soft" and "hard" consonants in Slavic languages.) The "light" consonants are considered more relaxed articulations.

The following are the consonant phonemes of Marshallese:

Although Marshallese has no voicing contrast in consonants, stops may be allophonically partially voiced, when they are between vowels and not geminated. Final consonants are often unreleased.

Glides  vanish in many environments, with surrounding vowels assimilating their backness and roundedness. That is motivated by the limited surface distribution of these phonemes as well as other evidence that backness and roundedness are not specified phonemically for Marshallese vowels. In fact, the consonant  never surfaces phonetically but is used to explain the preceding phenomenon. ( and  may surface phonetically in word-initial and word-final positions and, even then, not consistently.)

Bender (1968) explains that it was once believed there were six bilabial consonants because of observed surface realizations, but he determined that two of these, were actually allophones of  respectively before front vowels and allophones of  respectively before back vowels. Before front vowels, the velarized labial consonants  actually tend to have rounded (labiovelarized) articulations , but they remain unrounded on the phonemic level, and there are no distinct  phonemes. This article uses  in phonetic transcriptions.

Marshallese has no distinct  phoneme.

The dorsal consonants  are usually velar but with the tongue a little farther back , making them somewhere between velar and uvular in articulation. All dorsal phonemes are "heavy" (velarized or rounded), and none are "light" (palatalized). For simplicity, this article uses unmarked  in phonetic transcription.

The Marshallese-English Dictionary (MED) describes these as heavy dental nasals.

The MED and Willson (2003) describe the rhotic consonants as "retroflex", but are not clear how this relates to their dental or alveolar trill positions. (See retroflex trill.)

The velarized consonants (and, by extension, the rounded consonants) may be velarized or pharyngealized like the emphatic consonants in Arabic or Mizrahi Hebrew.

Vowels
Marshallese has a vertical vowel system of just four vowel phonemes, each with several allophones depending on the surrounding consonants.

On the phonemic level, while Bender (1969) and Choi (1992) agree that the vowel phonemes are distinguished by height, they describe the abstract nature of these phonemes differently, with Bender treating the front unrounded surface realizations as their relaxed state that becomes altered by proximity of velarized or rounded consonants, while Choi uses central vowel symbols in a neutral fashion to notate the abstract phonemes and completely different front, back and rounded vowel symbols for surface realizations. Bender (1968, 1969), MED (1976) and Willson (2003) recognize four vowel phonemes, but Choi (1992) observes only three of the phonemes as having a stable quality, but theorizes that there may be a historical process of reduction from four to three, and otherwise ignores the fourth phoneme. For phonemic transcription of vowels, this article recognizes four phonemes and uses the front unrounded vowel  notation of the MED, following the approach of Bender (1969) in treating the front vowel surface realizations as the representative phonemes.

On the phonetic level, Bender (1968), MED (1976), Choi (1992), Willson (2003) and Naan (2014) notate some Marshallese vowel surface realizations differently from one another, and they disagree on how to characterize the vowel heights of the underlying phonemes, with Willson (2003) taking the most divergent approach in treating the four heights as actually two heights each with the added presence (+ATR) or absence (-ATR) of advanced tongue root. Bender (1968) assigns central vowel symbols for the surface realizations that neighbor velarized consonants, but the MED (1976), Choi (1992) and Willson (2003) largely assign back unrounded vowel symbols for these, with the exception that the MED uses  rather than cardinal  for the close-mid back unrounded vowel, and Choi (1992) and Willson (2003) use  rather than cardinal  for the open back unrounded vowel. For phonetic notation of vowel surface realizations, this article largely uses the MED's notation, but uses only cardinal symbols for back unrounded vowels.

Superficially, 12 Marshallese vowel allophones appear in minimal pairs, a common test for phonemicity. However, the uneven distribution of glide phonemes suggests that they underlyingly end with the glides (thus ,). When glides are taken into account, it emerges that there are only 4 vowel phonemes.

When a vowel phoneme appears between consonants with different secondary articulations, the vowel often surfaces as a smooth transition from one vowel allophone to the other. It follows that there are 24 possible short diphthongs in Marshallese:

These diphthongs are the typical realizations of short vowels between two non-glide consonants, but in reality the diphthongs themselves are not phonemic, and short vowels between two consonants with different secondary articulations can be articulated as either a smooth diphthong (such as ) or as a monophthong of one of the two vowel allophones (such as ), all in free variation. Bender (1968) also observes that when the would-be diphthong starts with a back rounded vowel  and ends with a front unrounded vowel , then a vowel allophone associated with the back unrounded vowels (notated in this article as ) may also occur in the vowel nucleus. Before Bender's (1968) discovery that Marshallese utilized a vertical vowel system, it was conventional to transcribe the language in this manner with a presumed inventory of 12 vowel monophthong phonemes, and it remains in occasional use as a more condensed phonetic transcription. This article uses phonemic or diphthongal phonetic transcriptions for illustrative purposes, but for most examples it uses condensed phonetic transcription with the most relevant short vowel allophones roughly corresponding to Marshallese orthography as informed by the MED.

Some syllables appear to contain long vowels:  'future'. They are thought to contain an underlying glide (or ), which is not present phonetically.

Phonotactics
Syllables in Marshallese follow CV, CVC, and VC patterns. Marshallese words always underlyingly begin and end with consonants. Initial, final, and long vowels may be explained as the results of underlying glides not present on the phonetic level. Initial vowels are sometimes realized with an onglide  or  but not consistently:
  'weave'

Only homorganic consonant sequences are allowed in Marshallese, including geminate varieties of each consonant, except for glides. Non-homorganic clusters are separated by vowel epenthesis even across word boundaries. Some homorganic clusters are also disallowed:
 Obstruent-obstruent, nasal-nasal, liquid-liquid, nasal-obstruent, and nasal-liquid clusters undergo assimilation of the secondary articulation except if the first consonant is a rounded coronal or a rounded dorsal. Then, the clusters undergo assimilation of the rounded articulation.
 †Obstruent-liquid and liquid-obstruent clusters besides  and  undergo epenthesis.
 Liquid-nasal clusters undergo nasal assimilation.
 Obstruent-nasal clusters undergo epenthesis (if coronal) or nasal assimilation (if non-coronal).
 Clusters involving any glides undergo epenthesis, including otherwise homorganic clusters of two of the same glide.

The following assimilations are created, with empty combinations representing epenthesis.

The vowel height of an epenthetic vowel is not phonemic as the epenthetic vowel itself is not phonemic, but is still phonetically predictable given the two nearest other vowels and whether one or both of the cluster consonants are glides. Bender (1968) does not specifically explain the vowel heights of epenthetic vowels between two non-glides, but of his various examples containing such vowels, none of the epenthetic vowels has a height lower than the highest of either of their nearest neighboring vowels, and the epenthetic vowel actually becomes  if the two nearest vowels are both . Naan (2014) does not take the heights of epenthetic vowels between non-glides into consideration, phonetically transcribing all of them as a schwa . But when one of the consonants in a cluster is a glide, the height of the epenthetic vowel between them follows a different process, assuming the same height of whichever vowel is on the opposite side of that glide, forming a long vowel with it across the otherwise silent glide. Epenthetic vowels do not effect the rhythm of the spoken language, and can never be a stressed syllable. Phonetic transcription may indicate epenthetic vowels between two non-glides as non-syllabic, using IPA notation similar to that of semi-vowels. Certain Westernized Marshallese placenames spell out the epenthetic vowels:
 Ebeye, from earlier Ebeje, from 
 Erikub, from 
 Kwajalein, from 
 Majuro, from 
 Namorik, from 
 Rongelap, from 
 Rongerik, from 
 Ujelang, from 
 Uliga, from 
 Utirik, from 
Epenthetic vowels in general can be omitted without affecting meaning, such as in song or in enunciated syllable breaks. This article uses non-syllabic notation in phonetic IPA transcription to indicate epenthetic vowels between non-glides.

Timing 
The short vowel phonemes  and the approximant phonemes  all occupy a roughly equal duration of time. Though they occupy time, the approximants are generally not articulated as glides, and Choi (1992) does not rule out a deeper level of representation.

  is two morae: . It is also the shortest possible length of a Marshallese word.
  is three morae: .
  is four morae: .
 Prefixes like  are  sequences occupying only one mora but are attached to words rather than standing as words on their own.
 Suffixes like  are  sequences. The syllable itself occupies two morae but adds only one mora to the word because the vowel attaches itself to the last consonant phoneme in the word, changing  into .

That makes Marshallese a mora-rhythmed language in a fashion similar to Finnish, Gilbertese, Hawaiian, and Japanese.

Historic sound changes

Marshallese consonants show splits conditioned by the surrounding Proto-Micronesian vowels. Proto-Micronesian *k *ŋ *r become rounded next to *o or next to *u except in bisyllables whose other vowel is unrounded. Default outcomes of *l and *n are palatalized; they become velarized or rounded before *a or sometimes *o if there is no high vowel in an adjacent syllable. Then, roundedness is determined by the same rule as above.

Orthography

Marshallese is written in the Latin alphabet. There are two competing orthographies. The "old" orthography was introduced by missionaries. This system is not highly consistent or faithful in representing the sounds of Marshallese, but until recently, it had no competing orthography. It is currently widely used, including in newspapers and signs. The "new" orthography is gaining popularity especially in schools and among young adults and children. The "new" orthography represents the sounds of the Marshallese language more faithfully and is the system used in the Marshallese–English dictionary by Abo et al., currently the only complete published Marshallese dictionary.

Here is the current alphabet, as promoted by the Republic of the Marshall Islands. It consists of 24 letters.

Marshallese spelling is based on pronunciation rather than a phonemic analysis. Therefore, backness is marked in vowels despite being allophonic (it does change the meaning), and many instances of the glides  proposed on the phonemic level are unwritten, because they do not surface as consonants phonetically. In particular, the glide , which never surfaces as a consonant phonetically, is always unwritten.

The letter  is generally used only in three situations:
To mark a rounded consonant (one of ) or approximant phoneme before a vowel that precedes an unrounded consonant phoneme.
To mark a velarized bilabial consonant (either  or ) before a vowel that precedes a palatalized consonant phoneme.
To indicate a  glide phonetically surfacing either word-initially or between two vowels.
 is never written out word-finally or before another consonant.

  "Kwajalein".

A stronger raised palatal glide , phonemically analyzed as the exotic un-syllabic consonant-vowel-consonant sequence  rather than plain , may occur word-initially before any vowel and is written .

One source of orthographic variation is in the representation of vowels. Pure monophthongs are written consistently based on vowel quality. However, short diphthongs may often be written with one of the two vowel sounds that they contain. (Alternate phonetic realizations for the same phonemic sequences are provided purely for illustrative purposes.)
  "all; every".
Modern orthography has a bias in certain spelling choices in which both possibilities are equally clear between two non-approximant consonants.
   "big", not 
   "small", not 
 Historically, both  and  have been common and sometimes interchangeable. It is still true today with some words.
   "atoll; island; land", not 
   "Ebadon", not 
   "Christmas", not 
   "Nell", not 
   "pencil", not 

   "August".
   "Ujelang".
The exception is long vowels and long diphthongs made up of two mora units, which are written with the vowel quality closer to the phonetic nucleus of the long syllable:
   "kindness".
   "will be".
   "taxicab".

Display issues
In the most polished printed text, the letters  always appear with unaltered cedillas directly beneath, and the letters  always appear with unaltered macrons directly above. Regardless, the diacritics are often replaced by ad hoc spellings using more common or more easily displayable characters. In particular, the Marshallese-English Online Dictionary (but not the print version), or MOD, uses the following characters:

As of 2019, there are no dedicated precomposed characters in Unicode for the letters ; they must be displayed as plain Latin letters with combining diacritics, and even many Unicode fonts will not display the combinations properly and neatly. Although  exist as precomposed characters in Unicode, these letters also do not display properly as Marshallese letters in most Unicode fonts. Unicode defines the letters as having a cedilla, but fonts usually display them with a comma below because of rendering expectations of the Latvian alphabet. However, for some fonts, there is a workaround to display these letters properly if encoded as one of the base letters  followed by a zero-width non-joiner character and a combining cedilla character, yielding . This does not always produce a more accurate result if the combining diacritics appear misaligned with their letters.

Both systems already require fonts that display Basic Latin (with ) and Latin Extended-A (with ). The standard orthography also requires Combining Diacritical Marks for the combining diacritics. The MOD's alternative letters have the advantage of being neatly displayable as all-precomposed characters in any Unicode fonts that support Basic Latin, Latin Extended-A along with Latin-1 Supplement (with ) and Latin Extended Additional (with ). If a font comfortably displays both the International Alphabet of Sanskrit Transliteration and the Vietnamese alphabet, it can also display MOD Marshallese.

This chart highlights the display issues in common web fonts and common free Unicode fonts that are known to support standard or MOD Marshallese lettering. Distinct typefaces appear only if the operating environment supports them. Some fonts have combining diacritic alignment issues, and the vast majority of the fonts have the Latvian diacritic issue.

Differences in orthography
The old orthography was still very similar to the new orthography but made fewer phonological distinctions in spelling than the new orthography does. It has made the new orthography relatively easy for old orthography users to learn. The phonology of Marshallese was documented by Bender (1969) with written examples using the old orthography. Here are some differences between the new and old orthographies:
 The new orthography uses the cedillaed letters . The old orthography did not use cedillas and ambiguously wrote them .
The old orthography used  for both.
 Compare old  vs. new  , 'pencil'.
 The new orthography consistently uses  for "light"  in all positions. The old orthography often wrote  before vowels, and  after vowels.
 Compare old  vs. new  , 'United States'.
 Compare old  or  vs. new  , 'forever'.
 Compare old  vs. new  , 'Ebeye'.
 Compare old  vs. new  , 'Christmas'.
 The new orthography uses only  for allophones of the vowel phoneme . In the old orthography, some words used , but other words used  instead.
 Compare old  vs. new  , 'land'.
 The new orthography uses the letter  for the vowel monophthong allophone  along with many of its related diphthong allophones.
 Compare old  vs. new  , 'hello; good bye; love'.
 Compare old  vs. new  , 'taboo'.
 The new orthography tries to consistently write long vowels and geminated consonants with double letters. The old orthography habitually wrote these as single letters.
 Compare old  vs. new  , 'study'.
 Compare old  vs. new  , 'no'.
 The word   ('hello; goodbye; love') and the phrase   ('hello [to you]') are a special case. The new orthography's rules use , while the old orthography's rules used . However,  has been historically more entrenched in both orthographies, but the letter  does not exist in the normal spelling rules of either orthography. That spelling has multilingual significance as well;   is also the established spelling for the greeting when used in Marshallese-influenced English and by anglophones in the Marshall Islands.

Bender's orthography
In his 1968 publication Marshallese Phonology, linguist Byron W. Bender designed a purely morphophonemic orthography, containing only non-IPA symbols corresponding to consonant phonemes, vowel phonemes and regular reflexes between the dialects, intended for use in dictionaries and language teaching. Besides also appearing in his 1969 tutorial Spoken Marshallese, it appeared in a modified form alongside the "new" orthography in the 1976 Marshallese-English Dictionary (MED) to which he contributed. Bender later collaborated with Stephen Trussel when the MED was adapted to website format as the Marshallese-English Online Dictionary (MOD), with Bender's orthography appearing in an again-modified form.

The MOD's version of Bender's orthography uses under-dot diacritics instead of the cedillas used both by the "new" orthography and by the 1976 MED's version of Bender's orthography, for reasons specific to the MOD's display issues.

In addition to plain sequences of phonemes, Bender's orthography recognizes a few special sequences, many of which relate to regular differences between the Rālik and Ratak dialects of Marshallese.
For example,  is equivalent to   "hello; goodbye; love".
  at the beginning of a word, without apostrophes, indicates a version of  whose reflex differs between the two dialects.
 In the Ratak dialect,  becomes .
  at the beginning of a word (where "V" can be any vowel) indicates a back unrounded vowel that whose reflex differs between the dialects. In the Rālik dialect,  becomes , lengthening the vowel. In the Ratak dialect, the second  disappears, becoming , and the vowel remains short.
 In the Ratak dialect,  becomes .
  at the beginning of a word (where "V" can be any vowel) usually becomes  in the Rālik dialect, but usually becomes  in the Ratak dialect.
 In the Rālik dialect,  becomes , sprouting both a prothetic  and a vowel. The dialect generally spells this   "good" in the "new" orthography, making it homophonous with the phrase  which means "it is good" in both dialects.
 In the Ratak dialect,  becomes  with only a prothetic vowel, appearing instead between the two consonants. The dialect generally spells this   "good" in the "new" orthography.
But when spellings like  take prefixes with a vowel, there are no prothetic vowels:  "person" +  "good" becomes  , which the "new" orthography spells  "good person".

Grammar

Morphology
Nouns are not marked as nouns, and do not inflect for number, gender, or case. Nouns are often verbalized and verbs nominalized without any overt morphological marker:

1pl.in.agr-should sing.trans song of be.covered(=American)
'We should sing American songs.' (Willson 2008)

Marshallese has determiners and demonstratives which follow the noun they modify. These are marked for number, and in the plural also encode a human/nonhuman distinction. For example, in the singular  'the pencil' and  'the boy' take the same determiner, but in the plural  'the pencils' and  have different determiners. Indefinites are an exception; in the singular they are expressed with the word  'one' before the noun (e.g.  'a song'), and there is no plural indefinite determiner. The Marshallese demonstrative system has five levels: near the speaker (sg.  / pl. human  / pl. nonhuman ), near the speaker and listener, near the listener, away from both speaker and listener, and distant but visible.

Marshallese possesses two sets of 1st and 2nd person singular pronouns, known as "absolutive" or "emphatic" pronouns and as "objective" pronouns. Marshallese 1st person plurals mark for clusivity. Third person objective pronouns may only be used for humans; nonhumans instead take a null pronoun:

3s.agr-T(past) slap.trans 3pl.obj
'He slapped them (human).' (Willson 2008)

3s.agr-T(past) slap.trans-obj
'He slapped them (nonhuman).' (Willson 2008)

The emphatic pronouns serve as subjects of equational sentences, as complements of prepositions, in order to emphasize objects, in coordination structures, and with topicalized or focused subjects. It is common in Oceanic languages for a special type of pronoun to be used in equational sentences and for topicalization or focus.

1s.emph teacher
'I am a teacher.' (Willson 2008)

1s.emph 1s.agr.T(pres) love child the.pl.h cher.poss-1s.gen
'Me, I love my children.' (Willson 2008)

Syntax
Marshallese, like many Micronesian languages, divides sentences into two types: predicational sentences and equational sentences. Predicational sentences have SVO word order and a main verb:

3rdS-PRES play guitar.
'He plays guitar.' (Willson 2002)

In equational sentences, both the subject and predicate are noun phrases:

Dress DET 3rdS-beautiful.
'The dress is beautiful.' (Willson 2002)

Vocabulary

Cardinal numbers
This includes the cardinal numbers one through ten in the Rālik dialect. Where Ratak forms differ, they are listed in parentheses.
  
  
  
  
  
  
  
  

Months
  , 'January'
  , 'February'
  , 'March'
  , 'April'
  , 'May'
  , 'June'
  , 'July'
  , 'August'
  , also  , 'September'
  , 'October'
  , also  , 'November'
  , 'December'

Weekdays
  , 'Sunday; Sabbath'
  , 'Monday'
  , 'Tuesday'
  , 'Wednesday'
  , 'Thursday'
  , also  , also  , 'Friday'
  , 'Saturday'

Marshallese atolls and islands
  , 'Ratak Chain'
  , 'Ailuk Atoll'
  , 'Arno Atoll'
  , 'Aur Atoll'
  , 'Erikub Atoll'
  , 'Jemo Island'
  , 'Likiep Atoll'
  , 'Majuro Atoll'
  , 'Djarrit'
  , 'Laura'
  , 'Delap'
  , 'Uliga'
  , 'Mili Atoll'
  , 'Maloelap Atoll'
  , 'Knox Atoll'
  , 'Bikar Atoll'
  , 'Toke (Taka) Atoll'
  , 'Utirik Atoll'
  , 'Wotje Atoll'
  , 'Ralik Chain'
  , 'Ailinginae Atoll'
  , 'Ailinglaplap Atoll'
  , also  , 'Enewetak (Eniwetok) Atoll'
  , 'Lib Island'
  , 'Ebon Atoll'
  , 'Jabor Island'
  , 'Jabat (Jabot, Jabwot) Island'
  , 'Kili Island'
  , 'Kwajalein Atoll'
  , also  , 'Ebeye Island'
  , 'Lae Atoll'
  , 'Namdrik (Namorik) Atoll'
  , 'Namu Atoll'
  , 'Bikini Atoll'
  , 'Rongerik (Rongdrik) Atoll'
  , 'Rongelap Atoll'
  , 'Wotho Atoll'
  , 'Wake (Enenkio) Atoll' (claimed by the Marshall Islands, administered by the United States)

Other countries and places
  , 'United States (America)'
  , 'Hawaii', where a Marshallese diaspora lives
  , 'California', where a Marshallese diaspora lives
  , 'Arkansas', where a large Marshallese diaspora lives
  , 'Australia'
  , 'Asia'
  , also  , also  , 'China'
  , also  , 'Japan (Nippon)', former colonial ruler
  , 'Korea'
  , 'Philippines', former colonial administrator under Spanish rule
  , 'Russia'
  , 'Taiwan'
  , 'England'
  , 'Samoa'
  , 'Germany', former colonial ruler
  , 'Spain', former colonial ruler
  , 'Micronesia'
  , 'Caroline Islands'
  , also  , 'Palau'
  , 'Federated States of Micronesia (F.S.M.)'
  , 'Pohnpei (Ponape)'
  , 'Yap'
  , also  , 'Kosrae (Kusaie)'
  , 'Chuuk (Truk)'
  , 'Kiribati (Gilbert Islands)'
  , 'Mariana Islands'
  , 'Saipan'
  , 'Guam'
  , 'Nauru (Naoero)'
  , 'Mexico', former colonial administrator under Spanish rule
  , 'New Zealand'
  , also , 'New Guinea', former colonial administrator under German rule
  , 'Fiji'
  , 'Tuvalu'

Text examples

Modern orthography
Here is the Hail Mary in standard Marshallese orthography:

Older orthography
Here is the Lord's Prayer from the 1982 Marshallese Bible, which uses the older orthography:

References

Bibliography

Further reading
 Bender, Byron W. (1969). Vowel dissimilation in Marshallese. In Working papers in linguistics (No. 11, pp. 88–96). University of Hawaii.
 

 Hale, Mark. (2007) Chapter 5 of Historical Linguistics: Theory and Method. Blackwell
 
 
 Pagotto, L. (1987). Verb subcategorization and verb derivation in Marshallese: a lexicase analysis.

External links

Naan, a free Marshallese–English Dictionary for beginner/intermediate learners of both languages
Marshallese–English Online Dictionary
Marshallese Phrasebook on the website for the Republic of Marshall Islands lists the Marshallese word for the Marshallese language as 
Peace Corps Marshall Islands Marshallese Language Training Manual (PDF, 275 KB; instead of macrons uses trema on vowels and tilde on n, and underlines instead of cedillas)
Marshallese Spelling Reforms article in the blog, "Far Outliers"
Kaipuleohone has recordings of stories from the 1950s as well as index cards of plant and animal words
Materials on Marshallese are included in the open access Arthur Capell collections (AC1 and AC2) held by Paradisec

 
Micronesian languages
Vertical vowel systems